Hadley Delany is a former American child actress best known for her role as Lilly on the television series Louie, who she portrayed throughout the show, from 2010-2015.

In 2013, Delany was one of six children selected as Kids of the Year by New York magazine for her contributions to the film industry as a child actor.

Television work

See also
Played lead of Mean Girls "I'd Rather Be Me" music video.

References

External links
 

21st-century American actresses
Actresses from New York (state)
American child actresses
American television actresses
Living people
Year of birth missing (living people)
Place of birth missing (living people)